Payette is a city in and the county seat of Payette County, Idaho, United States. The population was 7,433 at the 2010 census. It is part of the Ontario, OR−ID Micropolitan Statistical Area.

History
The settlement was originally named "Boomerang," a construction camp for the Oregon Short Line from 1882 to 1884 at the mouth of the Payette River. Logs were floated down the river to the sawmills at the camp to produce railroad ties. After completion of the railroad, the settlement moved upstream to its present site and incorporated in 1891 as "Payette," to honor François Payette, a French-Canadian fur trapper and one of the first white men to explore the area. He arrived in present-day Idaho from Astoria and was later the head of the Fort Boise trading post for the British Hudson's Bay Company from 1835 to 1844.  A large merry man, Payette was highly regarded for his helpful assistance to the many travelers who came through the fort.  Following his retirement in 1844, he returned to Montreal, after which the rest of his life is a mystery.

Payette County was created in 1917, partitioned from Canyon County, and the city of Payette became the county seat.

Geography

Highways
 - US 95
 - SH-52

Demographics

2020 census
Note: the US Census treats Hispanic/Latino as an ethnic category. This table excludes Latinos from the racial categories and assigns them to a separate category. Hispanics/Latinos can be of any race.

As of the 2020 United States census, there were 8,127 people, 3,081 households, and 3,081 families residing in the city.

2010 census
As of the census of 2010, there were 7,433 people, 2,816 households, and 1,910 families living in the city. The racial makeup of the city was 86.6% White, 0.2% African American, 1.5% Native American, 0.8% Asian, 7.3% from other races, and 3.5% from two or more races. Hispanic or Latino of any race were 19.3% of the population.

There were 2,816 households, of which 36.7% had children under the age of 18 living with them, 48.2% were married couples living together, 13.6% had a female householder with no husband present, 6.0% had a male householder with no wife present, and 32.2% were non-families. 26.4% of all households were made up of individuals, and 12.3% had someone living alone who was 65 years of age or older. The average household size was 2.61 and the average family size was 3.12.

The median age in the city was 35 years. 28% of residents were under the age of 18; 9.5% were between the ages of 18 and 24; 24.5% were from 25 to 44; 22.5% were from 45 to 64; and 15.6% were 65 years of age or older. The gender makeup of the city was 48.9% male and 51.1% female.

2000 census
As of the census of 2000, there were 7,054 people, 2,619 households, and 1,841 families living in the city. The racial makeup of the city was 87.43% White, 0.09% African American, 1.15% Native American, 0.86% Asian, 0.03% Pacific Islander, 7.67% from other races, and 2.78% from two or more races. Hispanic or Latino of any race were 15.78% of the population.

There were 2,619 households, out of which 37.0% had children under the age of 18 living with them, 54.4% were married couples living together, 11.3% had a female householder with no husband present, and 29.7% were non-families. 25.8% of all households were made up of individuals, and 11.1% had someone living alone who was 65 years of age or older.  The average household size was 2.66 and the average family size was 3.20.

In the city, the population was spread out, with 30.7% under the age of 18, 9.0% from 18 to 24, 27.2% from 25 to 44, 19.2% from 45 to 64, and 13.9% who were 65 years of age or older.  The median age was 32 years. For every 100 females, there were 94.7 males.  For every 100 females age 18 and over, there were 91.4 males.

The median income for a household in the city was $29,375, and the median income for a family was $36,944. Males had a median income of $28,762 versus $19,781 for females. The per capita income for the city was $13,826.  About 11.4% of families and 15.2% of the population were below the poverty line, including 18.0% of those under age 18 and 12.3% of those age 65 or over.

Climate
Payette experiences a semi-arid climate (Köppen BSk) with cold, moist winters and hot, dry summers.  A weather station in nearby Ontario, Oregon has been in operation since 1903.

Notable people
 Diane Anderson-Minshall, journalist
 A. L. Freehafer, politician 
 William Norman Grigg, author
 Michael Hoffman, film director
 Donna M. Jones, former Idaho state controller
 Harmon Killebrew, member of the Baseball Hall of Fame raised and buried in Payette, Idaho 
 James A. McClure, U.S. Senator from Idaho, 1973–1991.
 Rick Rydell, radio host and author
 Herman Welker, U.S. Senator from Idaho, 1951–1957

References

External links
  - City of Payette
 Payette County USGenWeb

Cities in Payette County, Idaho
Cities in Idaho
County seats in Idaho
Ontario, Oregon micropolitan area